Humanex Academy is an accredited, private, non-profit middle and high school in Englewood, Colorado, United States, for neurodivergent students, including those with Autism, Anxiety, learning disabilities, and ADHD. The small, supportive, and individualized environment provided at Humanex enables students to be themselves and find success through built-in accommodations, differentiated curriculum, and embedded social coaching. 

Serving students in grades 6–12, Humanex Academy typically has around 40 students total.

History 
Humanex Academy was founded in 1983 by Cheryl Okizaki as an alternative school working with at-risk youth. In 1996, Humanex moved to its present location in Denver, Colorado.

Directors 
 Cheryl Okizaki (1983-2004)
 Brian Smith (2004-2005) 
 Tracy Wagers (2005–2012)
 Daniel R. Toomey (2012–2018)
 Kati Cahill (2018–Present)

References

External links 
 

Alternative schools in the United States
Educational institutions established in 1983
Englewood, Colorado
High schools in Denver
Special schools in the United States
Treatment of bipolar disorder
Schools in Arapahoe County, Colorado
Private high schools in Colorado
Private middle schools in Colorado
Schools in Denver
1983 establishments in Colorado